The Kim language of southern Chad is an Mbum language spoken by 15,000 people. It is one of the three members of the Kim languages group, together with Besme and Goundo.

The language was once mistakenly classified as Chadic, and called Masa, a Chadic name. 

There is strong dialectical divergence; Blench considers Garap (Éré), Gerep (Djouman, Jumam), Kolop (Kilop, Kolobo), and Kosop (Kwasap, Kim) to be distinct languages.

References

Languages of Chad
Kim languages